"Zvijerka" (means "Beast") is a song recorded by Bosnian pop recording artist Selma Bajrami. It was released on 9 May 2016 as the lead single from her upcoming ninth studio album.

The music video, filmed in Mostar, was released on YouTube on 15 June 2016.

References

2016 singles
2016 songs